Nyree Khadijah Roberts (born March 10, 1976) is an American professional women's basketball player. As a forward/center at Old Dominion University, Roberts was named to the Final Four All Tournament team in 1997. Roberts played in the WNBA from 1998 to 1999 as a member of the Houston Comets and Washington Mystics. She was raised in Jersey City, New Jersey.

Old Dominion University statistics
Source

References

1976 births
Living people
All-American college women's basketball players
American expatriate basketball people in Greece
American expatriate basketball people in Sweden
American women's basketball players
Basketball players from Jersey City, New Jersey
Centers (basketball)
Houston Comets players
Old Dominion Monarchs women's basketball players
People from Orange, New Jersey
Sportspeople from Essex County, New Jersey
Washington Mystics players